Yolki 5 (meaning Christmas Trees 5 or Those Christmas Trees), is a 2016 Russian comedy film, sequel to Yolki 1914. The roles are played by Ivan Urgant, Sergey Svetlakov, Kirill Pletnev, Katerina Shpitsa, Anna Khilkevich, Gosha Kutsenko, Maria Shukshina, Alexander Golovin. It premiered in Russia on December 22, 2016. The television premiere took place on July 6, 2018 on the television channel Russia-1.

The film was received negatively by viewers, who criticized the plot and acting, although the actions and acting of Urgant and Svetlakov were highly praised. "Yolki 5" grossed about 13 million dollars worldwide, making it a box office success. Despite this, its critical performance was lower than expected.

The next "Yolki 6" movie was released on December 21, 2017. The film, despite the original title and the changed actors, is not a reboot of the series.

Plot

Segment with Boris and Evgeniy
Boris has separated from his wife and wishes that everything would return to the way it was. Evgeniy tries to help him reconcile with his wife, but he does not suspect that Boris is planning to steal a penguin from Evgeniy's zoo, which he wants to give as a gift to his son.

Segment with Andrei
Andrei who had many girlfriends in the past, finally settles down. But he is jealous and constantly tests his wife for infidelity.

Segment with Snowboarder and the Skier
The snowboarder and the skier invite girls to their apartment. But the boys have been so distracted with computer games that they have forgotten to buy a Christmas tree. The girls threaten to leave if the guys fail to find and deliver a Christmas tree for them.

Segment with Konstantin
Konstantin is convinced that the way he meets the New Year will affect the rest of it. For this reason, he seeks in every possible way to attract the attention of Zhenechka and dissuade her, so that she does not marry another man.

Segment with Manya
Manya knows that it is possible to find everything and everyone on the internet, so she decides to find her old flame online. But there is one problem: she must be taught how to use a computer. Varya and Vova come to the rescue. They will have to face romantic desires.

Cast
Ivan Urgant as Boris Vorobiev
Sergey Svetlakov as Evgeny Pavlovich
Elena Plaksina as Olya, wife of Boris, mother of little Boris
Irina Arkhipova as Olya, wife of Evgeny
Alexander Golovin as Dimon Fomenko "tanker"
Alexander Domogarov Jr. as Grisha Zemlyanikin "tanker"
Anna Khilkevich as Lesya, Dimon's
Gosha Kutsenko as Professor Andrei Nikolaevich
Maria Shukshina as Natasha, wife of Andrei Nikolaevich
Kirill Pletnyov as Kostya
Katerina Shpitsa as Zhenya
Jan Tzapnik as Makar, seller of the penguin
Aleksandr Robak as Alexander Korovin
Anastasia Smetanina as Katya, girlfriend of Grisha
Galina Stakhanova as old woman Manya
Irina Chipizhenko as Tatyana, longtime acquaintance Manya, lift operator
Yuri Tsurilo as head of platform
Baimurat Allaberiyev as Yusuf, janitor
Adylbek Atykhaev as Ibrahim, janitor
Victor Nizovoi as police player with the nickname "The Bottle of Honey"
Aleksei Petrenko as Grigory Pavlovich Zemlyanikin, uncle of Boris
Irina Alfyorova as Yuliya Snegireva, wife of Zemlyanikin
Alina Bulynko as Varya
Sergey Pokhodayev as Vova
Mikhail Kornienko as himself, filmed in actual space onboard ISS.
Sasha Spielberg as herself
Yang Gordienko as himself
Julia Pushman as herself
Karina Kasparyants as herself
Marie Senne as herself
Elena Sheydlina as herself
Valeria Lubarsky as herself
Dmitry Ivanov as himself

Production
Yolki 5 consists of seven segments which unfold in Moscow, Saint Petersburg, Sochi, Chelyabinsk, Perm, Yekaterinburg, on the oil platform Prirazlomnaya, located in the Barents Sea and at the International Space Station at an altitude of 400 km above the ground.

References

External links

Films directed by Timur Bekmambetov
Films directed by Alexander Kott
2016 comedy films
Russian comedy films
Films set around New Year
Russian anthology films
Russian sequel films
Films shot in space
Bazelevs Company films